Hessenthal can mean:
 , an Ortsteil of Mespelbrunn, Germany
  (in the past also: Hessenthal), an  Ortsteil of Schwäbisch Hall, Germany